Sarah Leith Bahn is an American slalom canoeist who competed from the mid-1990s to the mid-2000s. She won a silver medal in the K-1 team event at the 1999 ICF Canoe Slalom World Championships in La Seu d'Urgell. She retired from whitewater slalom in 2004.

She is married to fellow canoeist Ryan Bahn.

References

Overview of athlete's results at canoeslalom.net

American female canoeists
Living people
Year of birth missing (living people)
Medalists at the ICF Canoe Slalom World Championships
21st-century American women